Mengoni is an Italian surname. Notable people with the surname include:

Andrea Mengoni (born 1983), Italian footballer
Giuseppe Mengoni (1829–1877), Italian architect
Marco Mengoni (born 1988), Italian singer-songwriter

Italian-language surnames